Urhan GAA is a Gaelic Athletic Association club located in the town land of Urhan in County Cork, Ireland. The club, situated in the heart of the Beara Peninsula is exclusively concerned with the game of Gaelic football. The club plays in the Beara division of Cork GAA.

Honours

 Cork Intermediate Football Championship (1): 1967
 Cork Junior Football Championship (4): 1927, 1931, 1960, 1992
 Beara Junior Football Championship (28): 1927, 1931, 1933, 1934, 1943, 1944, 1950, 1955, 1956, 1957, 1958, 1959, 1973, 1980, 1982, 1983, 1987, 1988, 1990, 1991, 1992, 2007, 2008, 2010, 2011, 2012, 2015, 2019

Notable players

Nealie Duggan
Con O'Sullivan
Jim Downing
Bobbie O'Dwyer
Ciarán O'Sullivan

External links
Urhan GAA site

Gaelic games clubs in County Cork
Gaelic football clubs in County Cork